Panisea is a genus of plant in family Orchidaceae. It is native to China, the Indian Subcontinent, and Indochina.

Species
Species currently accepted as of June 2014:

Panisea albiflora (Ridl.) Seidenf. - Vietnam
Panisea apiculata Lindl. - Assam, Indochina
Panisea cavaleriei Schltr. - Guangxi, Guizhou, Yunnan, Hainan
Panisea demissa (D.Don) Pfitzer in H.G.A.Engler - India, Laos, Myanmar, Nepal, Thailand, Vietnam, China
Panisea distelidia I.D.Lund - Myanmar, Thailand
Panisea garrettii (I.D.Lund) Aver. - Thailand, Vietnam
Panisea moi M.Z.Huang, J.M.Yin & G.S.Yang - Hainan
Panisea panchaseensis Subedi - Nepal
Panisea tricallosa Rolfe - Hainan, Yunnan, Assam, India, Bhutan, Nepal, Indochina 
Panisea uniflora (Lindl.) Lindl. - Yunnan, Assam, India, Bhutan, Nepal, Indochina 
Panisea yunnanensis S.C.Chen & Z.H.Tsi - Yunnan, Vietnam
Panisea zeylanica (Hook.f.) Aver. - Sri Lanka

References

External links 

 
Arethuseae genera
Taxonomy articles created by Polbot